Pip Blom is a Dutch indie band from Amsterdam. The band is named after lead singer Pip Blom. The band has released two full-length albums. Their first album titled Boat was released in 2019. In 2021, Pip Blom released their second full-length album titled Welcome Break. The album received positive reviews.

Discography

Studio albums
 Boat (2019)
 Welcome Break (2021)

References

Dutch indie pop groups
Dutch indie rock groups
Musical groups established in 2016
2016 establishments in the Netherlands
Heavenly Recordings artists